Mittelberg is a municipality in the district of Bregenz, Vorarlberg, Austria.

Mittelberg may also refer to:

Mittelberg (Rhön), a mountain of Germany
Mittelberg (Thuringian Highland), a mountain of Germany

See also
Großer Mittelberg (disambiguation), multiple hills and mountains of Germany
Oy-Mittelberg, a municipality in Oberallgäu, Bavaria, Germany